Hollygrove may refer to:

Hollygrove, County Galway, Ireland
Hollygrove, New Orleans, United States
Hollygrove, the fictional English village of the Michigan Renaissance Festival, United States
Hollygrove, West Virginia, United States

See also
Holly Grove (disambiguation)